Pascal Dion (born December 22, 1994) is a Canadian short-track speed skater and Olympic gold medalist.

Career

2015
Dion competed at the 2015 Winter Universiade in Granada, Spain, where he finished in fourth place in the 1,500 m event.

2016
As part of the 2015–16 ISU Short Track Speed Skating World Cup, Dion won his first medal as part of the 5,000 m relay team.

2017
Dion was named to Canada's 2018 Olympic team in August 2017. This marked his Olympic debut. Dion would win the bronze medal as part of the 5000 metres relay team.

2022
On January 17, 2022, Dion was named to Canada's 2022 Olympic team. Dion won a gold medal as part of Canada's team in the 5000 m relay event. Later in the season, Dion would win his first individual World Championships medal, a silver in the 1500 m.

References

External links

1994 births
Living people
French Quebecers
Speed skaters from Montreal
Short track speed skaters at the 2018 Winter Olympics
Short track speed skaters at the 2022 Winter Olympics
Canadian male short track speed skaters
Olympic short track speed skaters of Canada
Olympic gold medalists for Canada
Olympic bronze medalists for Canada
Olympic medalists in short track speed skating
Medalists at the 2018 Winter Olympics
Medalists at the 2022 Winter Olympics
World Short Track Speed Skating Championships medalists
Competitors at the 2015 Winter Universiade
Four Continents Short Track Speed Skating Championships medalists